Antonio Abetti (19 June 1846 – 20 February 1928) was an Italian astronomer.

Born in San Pietro di Gorizia (Šempeter-Vrtojba), he earned a degree in mathematics and engineering at the University of Padua.  He was married to Giovanna Colbachini in 1879 and they had two sons. He died in Arcetri.

Work
Abetti mainly worked in positional astronomy and made many observations of minor planets, comets, and star occultations.  In 1874 he was part of an expedition led by Pietro Tacchini to observe a transit of Venus with a spectroscope.  Later he became director of the Osservatorio Astrofisico di Arcetri and a professor at the University of Florence.  He refurbished the observatory at Arcetri by installing a new telescope.

Honors
 Member of the Accademia dei Lincei.
 Member of the Royal Astronomical Society.
 The crater Abetti on the Moon is named after both Antonio and his son Giorgio Abetti.
 The minor planet 2646 Abetti is also named after Antonio and his son.

References

External links 
Biography of Abetti

1846 births
1928 deaths
People from Šempeter pri Gorici
19th-century Italian astronomers
20th-century Italian astronomers
University of Padua alumni
Academic staff of the University of Florence